Comitas saudesae is a species of sea snail, a marine gastropod mollusc in the family Pseudomelatomidae, the turrids and allies.

Description
The length of the shell attains 24 mm.

Distribution
This marine species occurs off Northeast Taiwan.

References

 Cossignani T. (2018). Comitas saudesae nuova specie da Taiwan. Malacologia Mostra Mondiale. 98: 29-30.

saldanhae
Gastropods described in 2018